In mathematics, a Fréchet surface is an equivalence class of parametrized surfaces in a metric space. In other words, a Fréchet surface is a way of thinking about surfaces independently of how they are "written down" (parametrized). The concept is named after the French mathematician Maurice Fréchet.

Definitions

Let  be a compact 2-dimensional manifold, either closed or with boundary, and let  be a metric space.

An equivalence class  of parametrized surfaces under this notion of equivalence is called a Fréchet surface; each of the parametrized surfaces in this equivalence class is called a parametrization of the Fréchet surface

Properties

Many properties of parametrized surfaces are actually properties of the Fréchet surface, that is, of the whole equivalence class, and not of any particular parametrization.

References

 
 

Metric geometry